Maresch is a German-language surname, a Germanized version of Czech surname Mareš. Notable people with the surname include:

Anton Maresch (born 1991), Austrian basketball player
Franz Maresch (born 1972), Austrian footballer and manager
Rudolf Maresch (born 1934), Austrian cyclist
Sven Maresch (born 1987), German judoka

German-language surnames
Surnames of Czech origin